The 2022 CONCACAF Champions League (officially the 2022 Scotiabank CONCACAF Champions League) was the 14th edition of the CONCACAF Champions League under its current name, and overall the 57th edition of the premier football club competition organized by CONCACAF, the regional governing body of North America, Central America, and the Caribbean.

Monterrey was the title holder but did not qualify for this tournament and was unable to defend its title. American team Seattle Sounders FC won its first CONCACAF Champions League title, defeating Mexican club UNAM 5–2 on aggregate in the final. The Sounders thus became the first team from Major League Soccer to win the title under its current format. It was the first time since the 2005 CONCACAF Champions' Cup, that a non-Mexican team won the Champions' Cup or Champions League, and the first time since 2000 that an American team won the Champions' Cup or League.

Teams
The following 16 teams (from seven associations) qualified for the tournament.
North American Zone: 10 teams (from three associations), including one of them which qualified through the 2021 CONCACAF League
Central American Zone: 5 teams (from three associations), all of them qualified through the 2021 CONCACAF League
Caribbean Zone: 1 team (from one association), qualified through the 2021 Caribbean Club Championship

In the following table, the number of appearances, last appearance, and previous best result count only those in the CONCACAF Champions League era starting from 2008–09 (not counting those in the era of the Champions' Cup from 1962 to 2008).

Notes;

Draw

The draw for the 2022 CONCACAF Champions League was held on 15 December 2021, in Miami, Florida, United States.

The draw determined each tie in the round of 16 (numbered 1 through 8) between a team from Pot 1 and a team from Pot 2, each containing eight teams. The "Bracket Position Pots" (Pot A and Pot B) contains the bracket positions numbered 1 through 8 corresponding to each tie. The teams from Pot 1 are assigned a bracket position from Pot A and the teams from Pot 2 were assigned a bracket position from Pot B. Teams from the same association cannot be drawn against each other in the round of 16 except for "wildcard" teams which replace a team from another association.

The seeding of teams were based on the CONCACAF Club Index. The CONCACAF Club Index, instead of ranking each team, was based on the on-field performance of the teams that occupied the respective qualifying slots in the previous five editions of the CONCACAF Champions League. To determine the total points awarded to a slot in any single edition of the CONCACAF Champions League, CONCACAF used the following formula:

The slots were assigned by the following rules:
For teams from North America, nine teams qualified based on criteria set by their association (e.g., tournament champions, runners-up, cup champions), resulting in an assigned slot (e.g., MEX1, MEX2) for each team. If a team from Canada qualified through the CONCACAF League, they were ranked within their association, resulting in an assigned slot (i.e., CAN2) for them.
For teams from Central America, they qualified through the CONCACAF League, and were ranked per association by their CONCACAF League ranking, resulting in an assigned slot (e.g., CRC1, CRC2) for each team.
For teams from the Caribbean, the CONCACAF Caribbean Club Championship champions were assigned the Caribbean champion slot (i.e., CCC1). If teams from the Caribbean qualified through the CONCACAF League, they were ranked per association by their CONCACAF League ranking, resulting in an assigned slot (e.g., JAM1, SUR1) for each team.

The 16 teams were distributed in the pots as follows:

Format
Each tie, including the final, was played over two legs, with each team playing on a home-and-away basis.
In the round of 16, quarter-finals and semi-finals, the away goals rule was applied if the aggregate score was tied after the second leg. If still tied, a penalty shoot-out was used to determine the winner (Regulations Article 12.7).
In the final, extra time was played if the match was tied after regulation time of the second leg. The away goals rule was not applied. If the score was still tied after extra time in the second leg, a penalty shoot-out was used to determine the winner (Regulations Article 12.8).

Schedule
All matches were played on Tuesdays, Wednesdays and Thursdays.

Times are Eastern Time, as listed by CONCACAF (local times are in parentheses):
Times on 15 March 2022 – 4 May 2022 are Eastern Daylight Time, i.e., UTC−4.
Times otherwise are Eastern Standard Time, i.e., UTC−5.

Bracket

Round of 16
In the round of 16, the matchups were decided by draw: R16-1 through R16-8. The teams from Pot 1 in the draw hosted the second leg.

Summary
The first legs were played on 15–17 February, and the second legs were played on 22–24 February 2022.

|}

Matches

León won 3–0 on aggregate.

Seattle Sounders FC won 5–0 on aggregate.

1–1 on aggregate. Comunicaciones won 4–3 on penalties.

New York City FC won 6–0 on aggregate.

UNAM won 6–3 on aggregate.

New England Revolution advanced to the quarter-finals after Cavaly withdrew from the competition on 15 February 2022.CF Montréal won 3–1 on aggregate.Cruz Azul won 4–1 on aggregate.Quarter-finals
In the quarter-finals, the matchups were determined as follows:
QF1: Winner R16-1 vs. Winner R16-2
QF2: Winner R16-3 vs. Winner R16-4
QF3: Winner R16-5 vs. Winner R16-6
QF4: Winner R16-7 vs. Winner R16-8
The winners of round of 16 matchups 1, 3, 5 and 7 hosted the second leg.

Summary
The first legs were played on 8–9 March, and the second legs were played on 15–17 March 2022.

|}

MatchesSeattle Sounders FC won 4–1 on aggregate.5–5 on aggregate. New York City FC won on away goals.3–3 on aggregate. UNAM won 4–3 on penalties.Cruz Azul won 2–1 on aggregate.Semi-finals
In the semi-finals, the matchups were determined as follows:
SF1: Winner QF1 vs. Winner QF2
SF2: Winner QF3 vs. Winner QF4

The semi-finalists in each tie which had the better performance across all previous rounds hosted the second leg.

Summary
The first legs were played on 5–6 April, and the second legs were played on 12–13 April 2022.

|}

MatchesSeattle Sounders FC won 4–2 on aggregate.UNAM won 2–1 on aggregate.Final

In the final (Winner SF1 vs. Winner SF2), the finalist which had the better performances in previous rounds hosted the second leg.

Summary
The first leg was played on 27 April, and the second leg was played on 4 May 2022. Unlike previous rounds, the away goals rule did not apply in the final round.

|}

MatchesSeattle Sounders FC won 5–2 on aggregate.''

Top goalscorers

Awards

See also
2021 CONCACAF League

Notes

References

External links

Champions League
2022
Champions League
February 2022 sports events in North America
March 2022 sports events in North America
April 2022 sports events in North America
May 2022 sports events in North America